Văn Lang Private University is one of the first private universities in Vietnam under the administration of the Ministry of Education of Vietnam. It is located in Ho Chi Minh City since 1995 and was named for the ancient Vietnamese kingdom, Văn Lang.

Structure 
Văn Lang includes the following faculties:
 Faculty of Foreign Languages
 Faculty of Korean Language and Culture
 Faculty of Law
 Faculty of Architecture
 Faculty of Civil Construction
 Faculty of Environment and Biotechnology
 Faculty of Medicine
 Faculty of Traditional Medicine
 Faculty of Pharmacy
 Faculty of Nursing and Medical Technology
 Faculty of Oral and Dental Medicine
 Faculty of Information Technology
 Faculty of Electrical and Computer Engineering
 Faculty of Industrial Arts
 Faculty of Fine Arts and Design
 Faculty of Applied Arts
 Faculty of Public Relations and Media Communication
 Faculty of Humanities and Social Sciences
 Faculty of Finance and Banking
 Faculty of Accounting and Auditing
 Faculty of Commerce 
 Faculty of Business Administration
 Faculty of Tourism
 Faculty of Basic Science
 Faculty of Safety Technology
 Faculty of Creative Technology
 Faculty of Cinematic Arts and Theater
 Faculty of Automotive Engineering Technology

It also includes the following institutes:
 Institute of Culture, Arts and Media
 Institute of Postgraduate Education
 Institute of Applied Science and Technology
 Institute of International Education
 Institute of English Language
 Institute of Văn Lang Heritage
 Institute of Advanced Science and Technology
 Institute of Advanced Materials and Technology
 Institute of Computational Science and Artificial Intelligence
 Research Institute of Cultural Heritage and Development

References 

Universities in Ho Chi Minh City